The 2010 Asian Youth Boys Volleyball Championship was held in Azadi Volleyball Hall, Tehran, Iran from 13 to 21 May 2010.

Pools composition
The teams are seeded based on their final ranking at the 2008 Asian Youth Boys Volleyball Championship.

Preliminary round

Pool A

|}

|}

Pool B

|}

|}

Classification 9th–10th

|}

Final round

Quarterfinals

|}

5th–8th semifinals

|}

Semifinals

|}

7th place

|}

5th place

|}

3rd place

|}

Final

|}

Final standing

Awards
MVP:  Ramin Khani
Best Scorer:  Anup D'Costa
Best Spiker:  Jin Seong-tae
Best Blocker:  Armin Sadeghiani
Best Server:  Song Jianwei
Best Setter:  Lee Min-gyu
Best Libero:  Oh Jae-seong

References
www.asianvolleyball.org

External links
FIVB

A
V
Asian Boys' U18 Volleyball Championship
International volleyball competitions hosted by Iran